The 2018 Sailing World Cup is a series of regattas staged during the 2017–18 season. The series features sailing classes which are currently included on the Summer Olympics programme.

Regattas

Results

Men's 470

Women's 470

Men's 49er

Women's 49er FX

Men's Finn

Men's Laser

Women's Laser Radial

Mixed Nacra 17

Men's RS:X

Women's RS:X

References

External links
 Official website

2018
2017 in sailing
2018 in sailing
Test events for the 2020 Summer Olympic and Paralympic Games